Speakers of the Lower House of the Althing.

Below is a list of office-holders from 1889:

In 1991 the Alting became unicameral.

Sources
 The official website of the Althing

Main2
Althing
Althing